Thomas Fairfax was an Anglican Archdeacon in Ireland in the 17th century.

Fairfax was the Rector of Clones. He was Treasurer of Dromore from 1635 to 1638;  
and Archdeacon of Clogher  from 1638 until his death on 16 March 1641.  Fairfax is buried at St. Michan's Church, Dublin.

References

17th-century Irish Anglican priests
Archdeacons of Clogher
1641 deaths